Guity Novin (née Navran; born 1944) is an Iranian-born Canadian artist, known as a figurative painter and graphic designer. She classifies her work as "transpressionism" (trans- and impressionism), a term coined by Novin in the 1990s. Her works are in private and public collections worldwide. Novin has served on a UNESCO national committee of artists.

Early life and education
Novin was born Guity Navran in 1944 in Kermanshah, Iran. In early 1953, the Navran family moved to Tehran.

Career 
After graduating from the Faculty of Fine Arts with a BA in graphic design, Novin was employed as a graphic designer in the Department of Graphic Arts at the Ministry of Culture and Arts (MCA) in Tehran, in 1970. She also began to design the cover of magazines like Zaman, and various literally periodicals such as Chaapar, and Daricheh.

In addition she participated in numerous group exhibitions such as the Women artists exhibition during Asian Games of 1974. As well, She exhibited in the Salon d' autumn, Paris.
Her illustrations were published in Le Carnaval de la licorne (2001), and her work Pears in Blue was published in Abnormal Psychology.

Vancouver period, 1996 to present
Novin moved to Vancouver in 1996. From 1996 onwards in a series of shows, she called her style as Transpressionism, and viewed it as a new initiative in art. Solo shows in this period include The Bliss of Solitude (2004), And Yet the Menace of the Years Find, and Shall Find, Me Unafraid (2006), Whispered of peace, and truth, and friendliness unquelled (2007), 'She opened her door and her window, And the heart and the soul came through" (2008), and "but love is the sky and I am for you, just so long and long enough" (2009) (All at North Vancouver Community Arts Council, "Art in Garden"). She also participated in a number of group shows, including two shows at the Ferry Building Gallery in 2006 and 2008, and in the CityScape gallery in 2009.

Graphic design work 
Novin has illustrated the covers of magazines like Negin and Zaman; and the publications of the Free Cinema of Iran. She was also the graphic designer of the First Tehran International Film Festival. In Ottawa her illustrations were published in the Breaking The Silence Magazine during the 1980s.

Notes and references

Further reading

 L'actuelle exposition des peintures de Guity Novin à la Galerie Negar, Nicole Van de Ven, Journal de Téhéran, 2 Dec
 Whispering of A Woman Painter, By Florence, Ayandegan, 23rd, Azar 1350, November 1971, p. 4
 A Critique of Guity Novin Exhibition, in Negar Gallery, by Mansooreh Hosseini, Kayhan, November 1971
 Expression of Silence, Negin, 30th, Mehr 1350, September 1971. No. 77, 7th Year. p. 19.
 Expression of Silence, by F. Hajir, Ettelaat, No. 13666, 16th, Azar 1350, 1971, p 11.
 The rapture of Young Painters, Zan-e Rooz, No. 352, Azar 1350, October 1971.
 Exhibition of Paintings by Guity Novin—A journey into the Poetic Spaces of Shamloo, in Seyhoon Gallery, Ayandegan, Khordad, 1352, May 1973, p. 4.
 "I'm the Painter of Poetical Spaces" A Conversation with Guity Novin, Ettelaat, 17th, Khordad 1352, May 1973, No. 14119. p. 7.
 A great quest in an exhibition, Ettelaat-e Banuvan, 6th, Tir 1352 July 1973.
 " A poetic cry in painting" on Exhibition of Guity Navran (Novin) in Seyhoon Gallery, Zan-e Rooz, 30th, Tir 1352, June 1973. No. 431.
 A review of Guity Navran exhibition a Journey into the poetical spaces of Shamloo"', by Firoozeh Mizani, Tamasha, 26th, Khordad 1352, May 1971, No. 114.
 "A Heritage from Ancient Persia," a critique of Guity Novin's exhibition Lost Serenade'' at the Brock street Gallery by Don McCallum, The Whig-Standard, Vol. 2, No. 51, Kingston, Ontario, 3 October 1981.
 "Artistic Underground Surfaces" on Brock Street, by Frank Berry, The Queen's Journal, 9 October 1981.
 "Circles of Time, A Conversation with Guity Novin", by S. Motazedi, Shahrvand, Toronto, Vol. 10, No. 532, November 2000, p. 30.

External links

 
 The Transpressionism Website

1944 births
Living people
20th-century Canadian women artists
21st-century Canadian women artists
20th-century Iranian women artists
21st-century Iranian women artists
Canadian graphic designers
Canadian illustrators
Canadian contemporary painters
Canadian poster artists
Canadian women painters
Iranian graphic designers
Iranian painters
Iranian emigrants to Canada
Exiles of the Iranian Revolution in Canada
People from Kermanshah
Women graphic designers